Aaron Dean Thomason (born 26 June 1997) is an English cricketer who plays for Sussex County Cricket Club. Primarily a right-handed batsman, he also bowls right-arm fast-medium. He made his first-class debut on 18 June 2019, for Sussex in the 2019 County Championship.

References

External links
 
 Aaron Thomason at Warwickshire County Cricket Club

1997 births
Living people
English cricketers
Cricketers from Birmingham, West Midlands
Sussex cricketers
Warwickshire cricketers
English cricketers of the 21st century
Cambridgeshire cricketers